Lampropeltis getula, commonly known as the eastern kingsnake, common kingsnake, or chain kingsnake,  is a harmless colubrid species endemic to the United States and Mexico. It has long been a favorite among collectors.  Nine  subspecies are currently recognized, including the nominate subspecies described here.

Description
 

The color pattern consists of a glossy black, blue black, or dark brown ground color, overlaid with a series of 23-52 white chain-like rings. Kingsnakes from the coastal plains have wider bands, while those found in mountainous areas have thinner bands or may be completely black.

Common names
Common names for L. getula include eastern kingsnake, common kingsnake, chain kingsnake, kingsnake, Carolina kingsnake, chain snake, bastard horn snake, black kingsnake, black moccasin, common chain snake, cow sucker, eastern kingsnake, horse racer, master snake, North American kingsnake, oakleaf rattler, pied snake, pine snake, racer, rattlesnake pilot, thunder-and-lightning snake, thunderbolt, thunder snake, wamper, wampum snake. In North Carolina, it is also called the pied piper.

Geographic range
L. getula is found in the United States in Alabama, Arizona, Arkansas, California, portions of Colorado, Delaware, Florida, Georgia, south and southwest Illinois, southern Indiana, southern Iowa, Kansas, Kentucky, Louisiana, Maryland, Mississippi, Missouri, Nebraska, southern and western Nevada, New Jersey, New Mexico, New York, North Carolina, southern Ohio, Oklahoma, southern Oregon, South Carolina, Tennessee, Texas, southern Utah, Virginia, and West Virginia. It is also found in northern Mexico, including all of Baja California. It has been introduced to Gran Canaria in the Canary Islands, where in 2014,  the population had reached an estimated 20,000 individuals.

Habitat
The preferred habitats of L. getula are open areas, particularly grassland, but also chaparral, oak woodland, abandoned farms, desert, low mountains, sand, and any type of riparian zone, including swamps, canals, and streams. A study on the habitat use of the Eastern Kingsnake found that overall they prefer and can be found in sites with thick layer of leaf litter and dense shrubbery. From their observations throughout the course of research, they found that 79% of their tracked specimen spent the majority of their time concealed under the cover of soil and leaf litter.

Although commonly described as diurnal, some reports suggest that the Eastern Kingsnake are crepuscular or nocturnal during the hottest parts of the year. 

It has been found that Eastern Kingsnake home ranges often show little-to-no overlap.

Some studies show that Eastern Kingsnakes (L. g. getula), especially males, are territorial, and will commence in combat if their territory is threatened by another snake.

Diet
L. getula eats other snakes, including venomous snakes such as copperheads (Agkistrodon contortrix), which are responsible for more venomous snakebites than any other in the United States, as well as coral snakes (Micruroides and Micrurus), massasaugas (Sistrurus catenatus), and other rattlesnakes (Crotalus and Sistrurus). Among the non-venomous snakes preyed upon include common garter snakes (Thamnophis sirtalis), common watersnakes (Nerodia sipedon), ring-necked snakes (Diadophis punctatus), smooth earth snakes (Virginia valeriae), and worm snakes (Carphophis amoenus).

It has developed a hunting technique to avoid being bitten by clamping down on the jaws of the venomous prey, but even if envenomated, it is immune. It also eats amphibians, turtle eggs, bird eggs (including those of the northern bobwhite [Colinus virginianus]), lizards (such as five-lined skinks [Plestiodon fasciatus]), and small mammals (such as white-footed mice [Peromyscus leucopus]), which it kills by constriction.

Due to their diet of eating other snake species, kingsnakes are a key factor in the spread of ophidiomycosis. This is a relatively new snake fungal disease originating from the fungus, Ophidiomyces ophiodiicola. This disease has a variety of impacts on snakes and the extent of this impact is still being researched.

Reproduction
L. getula is oviparous. Adult females lay up to several dozen eggs that hatch after 2.0-2.5 months of incubation. Hatchlings are brightly colored and feed on small snakes, lizards, and rodents. Eastern Kingsnakes (L. g. getula) are active from April–October in most parts of their habitat range and breeding occurs in the spring months. Neck-biting is a common behavior when mating.

In captivity
Long a favorite among collectors, L. getula does well in captivity, living to 25 years or more. Some of the most popular subspecies of the common kingsnake kept in captivity are the California, Brooks', Florida, and Mexican black kingsnakes.

Subspecies

References

Further reading
Hubbs, Brian (2009). Common Kingsnakes: A Natural History of Lampropeltis getula. Tempe, Arizona: Tricolor Books. 436 pp. .
Linnaeus C (1766). Systema naturæ per regna tria naturæ, secundum classes, ordines, genera, species, cum characteribus, differentiis, synonymis, locis. Tomus I. Editio Duodecima, Reformata. Stockholm: L. Salvius. 532 pp. (Coluber getulus, new species, p. 382). (in Latin).
Powell R, Conant R, Collins JT (2016). Peterson Field Guide to Reptiles and Amphibians of Eastern and Central North America, Fourth Edition. Boston and New York: Houghton Mifflin Harcourt. xiv + 494 pp. . (Lampropeltis getula, p. 379 + Plate 34).
Smith HM, Brodie ED Jr (1982). Reptiles of North America: A Guide to Field Identification. New York: Golden Press. 240 pp.  (paperback),  (hardcover). (Lampropeltis getula, pp. 180–181).
Stebbins RC (2003). A Field Guide to Western Reptiles and Amphibians, Third Edition. The Peterson Field Guide Series. Boston and New York: Houghton Mifflin Company. xiii + 533 pp. . (Lampropeltis getula, pp. 364–366 + Plate 44 + Map 153).

External links

Eastern Kingsnake at the Florida Museum of Natural History. Accessed June 29, 2008.

getula
Fauna of the Eastern United States
Reptiles of the United States
Taxa named by Carl Linnaeus
Reptiles described in 1766
Reptiles of the Canary Islands